A sounding board, also known as a tester and abat-voix is a structure placed above and sometimes also behind a pulpit or other speaking platform that helps to project the sound of the speaker. It is usually made of wood.  The structure may be specially shaped to assist the projection, for example, being formed as a parabolic reflector. In the typical setting of a church building, the sounding board may be ornately carved or constructed. The term "abat-voix," from the French word for the same thing (abattre (“to beat down”) + voix (“voice”)), is also used in English.

The term “sounding board” is also used figuratively to describe a person who listens to a speech or proposal in order that the speaker may rehearse or explore the proposition more fully.
The term is also used inter-personally to describe one person listening to another, and especially to their ideas. When a person listens and responds with comments, they provide a perspective that otherwise would not be available through introspection or thought alone.

See also

Baldachin - canopy over altar or throne
Chhatri

References

Acoustics
Church architecture
Pulpits